Guess Who's Back? is the debut official mixtape by American rapper 50 Cent, released May 21, 2002 on independent label Full Clip Records in the United States. It is his first official release after his 2000 effort Power of the Dollar went unreleased due to Columbia Records' discovery of a May 2000 shooting where 50 Cent was struck by nine bullets, and was subsequently dropped from the label as a result. The album features production by Trackmasters, DJ Clark Kent, Father Shaheed, Sha Money XL, Red Spyda, and Terence Dudley. Guess Who's Back? received generally positive reviews from music critics and peaked at number 28 on the U.S. Billboard 200 chart.

Background
The album's cover image was later used in the video for 50 Cent's song "Piggy Bank". The album was recorded in Canada after 50 Cent was "blacklisted" in the recording industry and was unable to find a studio to work with in the U.S. As of May 2004, the album has sold over 400,000 copies in the United States.

After releasing the album, 50 Cent was discovered by rapper Eminem, who listened to a copy of the album through 50 Cent's attorney, who was working with Eminem's manager, Paul Rosenberg, and he was signed to Interscope Records.

The tracks "Your Life's on the Line", "Corner Bodega", "Ghetto Qu'ran" and "As The World Turns" were originally to be released on 50 Cent's shelved album, Power of the Dollar. "Killa Tape" and "That's What's Up" would later go on to appear on the mixtape, 50 Cent Is the Future. "U Not Like Me"  and "Life's on the Line" would later appear on 50 Cent's debut studio album, [[Get Rich or Die Tryin' (album)|Get Rich or Die Tryin''']].

Track listing

Charts

References

External links
 Guess Who's Back?'' at Discogs

2002 mixtape albums
50 Cent albums
Debut mixtape albums